Dung 4 is a demo album by the British indie rock band Inspiral Carpets. It was first released in May 1989 on Inspiral Carpets' own Cow Records and only on cassette. The name refers to the catalogue number.

In 2014, it was announced that Dung 4 would be re-released on vinyl and CD on Cherry Red Records on 19 and 28 April respectively, with the contents of Inspiral Carpets' earlier demo EP Cow, as bonus tracks. On the LP version, Cow was included as a bonus 7-inch EP, while on the CD its tracks were appended to the end of the Dung 4 program. A second vinyl reissue of Dung 4 was released on the Tiger Bay label in Europe, containing the entire contents of both demos on a single album.

Track listing 
 Keep The Circle Around    
 Seeds Of Doubt    
 Joe    
 Causeway    
 Inside My Head    
 Sun Don't Shine    
 Theme From Cow    
 Butterfly    
 26    
 Garage Full Of Flowers    
 96 Tears 
 Head For The Sun *
 Now You're Gone *
 Whiskey *
 Love Can Never Lose Its Own *
* Bonus tracks from LP and CD reissues. Note that on the 2018 LP reissue, "Sun Don't Shine" and "Causeway" were moved to the beginning of the B-side.

The version of "Joe" on this album was previously released on the Manchester, North of England compilation album in 1988.

Personnel 
Clint Boon - keyboards, backing vocals
Craig Gill - drums
Stephen Holt - lead vocals
Graham Lambert - guitars
Dave Swift - bass

References

External links 
 Official artist website

1989 debut albums
Inspiral Carpets albums